Anax tristis, the black emperor or magnificent emperor, is a species of dragonfly in the family Aeshnidae. It is found in Angola, Botswana, Cameroon, Chad, Comoros, Ivory Coast, Equatorial Guinea, Gabon, Gambia, Ghana, Guinea, Kenya, Liberia, Madagascar, Malawi, Mauritania, Mozambique, Namibia, Nigeria, South Africa, Sudan, Tanzania, Togo, Uganda, Zambia, Zimbabwe, possibly Burundi, and possibly Ethiopia. Its natural habitats are subtropical or tropical dry forests, subtropical or tropical moist lowland forests, dry savanna, moist savanna, subtropical or tropical dry shrubland, subtropical or tropical moist shrubland, swamps, intermittent freshwater lakes, freshwater marshes, and intermittent freshwater marshes.

References

Aeshnidae
Insects described in 1867
Taxonomy articles created by Polbot